Skjoldenæsholm Castle is a manor house located 11 kilometres north-east of Ringsted, Denmark, standing on the west side of one of the many lakes which dominate the area. The Neoclassical main building, possibly by Philip de Lange, is now run as a hotel and conference centre while the grounds play host to both the Skjoldenæsholm Tram Museum (Sporvejsmuseet Skjoldenæsholm) and a golf course. The rest of the land is mostly forested.

History

The first castle
King Christopher II mortgaged the estate to John III, Count of Holstein-Plön (Johan den Milde). King Valdemar IV can with certainty be linked to the locale, in either 1346 or 1348, when he besieged the castle.

Müller's house
The medieval castle was demolished in 1567 but a castle bank surrounded by moats can still be seen at the site today. The estate was crown land for an extended period of time, held in fee by various members of the Danish nobility until 1662 when it was ceded to the King's rentemester Henrik Müller (1609-1692). Over the next few years, between 1663 and 1666, Müller completed a new manor house, half-timbered and in one storey, at the site of the current main building.

Danneskiold-Laurvig era
After Müller's death in 1682, the estate was reacquired by the king, Christian V, who the following year gave it to his half-brother Ulrik Frederik Gyldenløve, who also owned the Gyldenløve Mansion in Copenhagen as well as several other estates in Denmark and in Norway. After his death, Skjoldenæsjolm remained in his family for almost a century. Count Ferdinand Anton Danneskiold-Laurvig, Ulrik Frederik Gyldenløve's son, owned the property from 1720 until his death in 1754. Anna Joachimine Danneskiold-Laurvig née Ahlefeldt (1717–1795) the widow after his son, replaced the old main wing with the one seen today in 1766.

Bruun de Neergaards  era
Anna Joachimine Danneskiold-Laurvig was the last member of the family to own Skjoldenæsholm, selling the property in 1794, shortly before her death the following year. The buyer was Anna Marie Bruun de Neergaard (née Møller) and Skjoldenæsholm has remained in the ownership of members of the  Bruun de Neergaard family.

Today
The main building was in 1971 converted into a conference centre. The rest consists mainly of forest.

In 1998, the castle was setting for Thomas Vinterberg's film The Celebration, one of the central works of the Danish Dogme 95 group.

Architecture

The sober Neoclassical main wing from 1766 stands in washed, yellow brick. The architect is not known but may have been Philip de Lange.

Originally, the red hip roof also covered the three-bay median risalits, found on both sides of the main wing, which received their triangular pediment in connection with a major renovation in 1703. The renovation also added a new east wing and gave the old half-timbered west wing a new facade in masonry towards the courtyard, which matched it. The east wing is connected to a surviving part of Müller's half-timbered timber-framed house..

The interior displays several fine examples of 18th-century period decorations.

See also
 The Celebration, a 1998 Danish film which is set within the castle.

References

External links

 Official website

Manor houses in Ringsted Municipality
Hotels in Denmark
Listed castles and manor houses in Denmark
Listed buildings and structures in Ringsted Municipality
Houses completed in 1766
Timber framed buildings in Ringsted Municipality